The Skunk River Bridge is a Warren truss bridge that crosses Skunk River near Ames, Iowa in Story County, Iowa.  It was built in 1876, and was added to the National Register of Historic Places in 1998.

Description
In 1876, Story County Supervisors contracted with King Iron Bridge Company to build three iron truss bridges, the longest of which would cross the Skunk River, just east of Cambridge, Iowa. This bridge was used frequently, and underwent occasional repairs. By 1916, it was no longer sufficient to handle the traffic on its road. It was subsequently replaced and moved to its present location, southeast of Ames, Iowa. The bridge was used lightly until 1990, when the road it was on was abandoned. It is still standing, but has fallen into a state of disrepair.

This bridge was added to the National Register of Historic Places in 1998. It was one of only a few Warren truss iron bridges built in Iowa in the late 19th century, and was an important transportation resource during a time of great growth in Story County.

See also
Quarry Bridge, also by the King Iron Bridge Company and NRHP-listed

References

National Register of Historic Places in Story County, Iowa
Road bridges on the National Register of Historic Places in Iowa
Bridges completed in 1876
Bridges in Story County, Iowa
Iron bridges in the United States
Warren truss bridges in the United States